Paramenexenus is a genus of Asian stick insects belonging to the family Lonchodidae, erected by Josef Redtenbacher in 1908.

Species
The Phasmida Species File lists:
Paramenexenus carinulatus 
Paramenexenus ceylonicus  - type species (as P. molestus Redtenbacher)
Paramenexenus congnatus 
Paramenexenus inconspicuus 
Paramenexenus laetus  - the "Vietnam green stick insect"
Paramenexenus subalienus 
Paramenexenus teres

References

External links

Lonchodidae
Phasmatodea genera
Phasmatodea of Asia